Lobularia is a genus of soft corals in the family Alcyoniidae.

Former species
According to the World Register of Marine Species, none of the species previously classified in this genus are accepted as members. So while the genus exists, it is unoccupied.

Previously classified species and their new accepted classifications are as follows:
Lobularia digitata (Linnaeus, 1758) accepted as Alcyonium digitatum Linnaeus, 1758
Lobularia pauciflora (Ehrenberg, 1834) accepted as Cladiella pauciflora Ehrenberg, 1834
Lobularia rubiformis Eherenberg, 1834 accepted as Gersemia rubiformis (Ehrenberg, 1834)
Lobularia spinulosum (Delle Chiajie, 1822) accepted as Paralcyonium spinulosum Delle Chiaje, 1822

References

Alcyoniidae
Octocorallia genera